Brest Bretagne Airport , formerly known as Brest Guipavas Airport, is an international airport serving Brest, France. It is located in the commune of Guipavas and 10.2 km (6.4 miles) northeast of Brest, within the département of Finistère.

Overview
Though the main operator is Air France (and subsidiary HOP!), serving for the most part Paris, other scheduled services are offered elsewhere in France and to the United Kingdom.  The aggressive efforts the Chamber of Commerce conducted allowed the airport to grow dramatically over the past decade thanks to charter airlines, as can be seen below.

Airlines and destinations 
The following airlines operate regular scheduled and charter flights at Brest Bretagne Airport:

Statistics

References

External links 

Brest Bretagne Airport (official site)
Aéroport de Brest Bretagne (Union des Aéroports Français) 

Airports in Brittany
Transport in Brest, France
Buildings and structures in Brest, France